II is the second studio album by English metal band Xerath, released on 3 May 2011 through Candlelight Records. It was mixed and mastered by Jacob Hansen at Hansen Studios. Drum recording and tracking was done by Chris Fielding at Foel Studios. As with the first album, the artwork was by done Colin Marks of Rainsong Design.

Track listing

References

External links
Xerath Official website
Xerath Myspace page
Candlelight Records
Xerath last fm page
Rain Song Design

2011 albums
Candlelight Records albums
Xerath albums